Oil terminals are key facilities for the import, export, storage, blending, transfer and distribution of oil and petroleum products. Many terminals are located at coastal sites, such as Teesside and the lower Thames, to allow the offloading and loading of coastal shipping. Inland terminals, located around major cities, such as Birmingham and Manchester, facilitate the distribution of products to local industrial and commercial users. Many terminals have road tanker loading equipment for local distribution of products such as petrol, diesel, and heating oil. The terminals are connected through a network of underground pipelines to enable the transfer of oil and refined products across Britain.

List of oil terminals in the United Kingdom 
The following is a list of oil and petroleum product terminals in the UK 

Acronyms used in the list include: 

 BPA  British Pipelines Agency
 CLH  Compañía Logística de Hidrocarburos
 GPSS  Government Pipelines and Storage System
 LCC  Lissan Coal Company
 OPA  Oil and Pipelines Agency
 PSD  Petroleum Storage Depot

See also 
 Oil Terminal
 UK oil pipeline network
Oil terminals in Ireland
 CLH Pipeline System
 Oil and Pipelines Agency

 For details of UK gas terminals see individual articles: Bacton, CATS, Easington, Rampside, St Fergus, Theddlethorpe (closed).
 For details of UK Liquefied Natural Gas (LNG) terminals see individual articles: Grain LNG, South Hook LNG terminal.

References 

Petroleum infrastructure in the United Kingdom
Fuels infrastructure in the United Kingdom
Petroleum industry in the United Kingdom
 
Fossil fuels
Oil terminals